Baruva Beach is situated on the east coast of Bay of Bengal in Baruva, a village at a distance of  from Palasa.

History 
Baruva Beach is one of the oldest beaches in Andhra Pradesh. It was used as seaport until 1948. On the beach is a commemorative pillar placed in remembrance of a cargo ship that sank nearby in 1917. It is also called as the second  Goa of India.

See also
List of beaches in India

References 

Beaches of Andhra Pradesh
Geography of Srikakulam district